BPMD is an American heavy metal supergroup. Formed in 2019, the band consists of Overkill vocalist Bobby "Blitz" Ellsworth, Vio-lence and former Machine Head guitarist Phil Demmel, and two members of Metal Allegiance–bassist Mark Menghi and drummer Mike Portnoy.

History
BPMD was conceived in the summer of 2019 when Ellsworth, Demmel, Menghi and Portnoy teamed up to record an album featuring covers of 1970s songs, titled American Made. In a January 2020 interview on The Blairing Out with Eric Blair Show, Demmel revealed that the project would be called BPMD, in reference to three of the members' last names as well as Ellsworth's nickname Blitz. About the project, he said: "It's all cover tunes from American bands of the '70s. It's called American Made, [and it's got songs from] ZZ Top, Lynyrd Skynyrd, James Gang, Aerosmith, Grand Funk Railroad — all these cover tunes that we modernized them and not really thrashed them up, but we made kind of metal versions of them. And we think we found maybe a label home, and we're looking to put the record out here probably at the end of the first quarter, maybe beginning of second quarter. It's all up in the air right now."

American Made was released on June 12, 2020, through Napalm Records, and includes ten song covers.

Discography
 American Made (2020)

References

Musical quartets
Musical groups established in 2019
Heavy metal supergroups
2019 establishments in the United States